Aminorex (Menocil, Apiquel, aminoxaphen, aminoxafen, McN-742) is a weight loss (anorectic) stimulant drug. It was withdrawn from the market after it was found to cause pulmonary hypertension. In the U.S., it is an illegal Schedule I drug, meaning it has high abuse potential, no accepted medical use, and a poor safety profile.

Aminorex, in the 2-amino-5-aryl oxazoline class, was developed by McNeil Laboratories in 1962. It is closely related to 4-methylaminorex. Aminorex has been shown to have locomotor stimulant effects, lying midway between dextroamphetamine and methamphetamine.  Aminorex effects have been attributed to the release of catecholamines. It can be produced as a metabolite of the worming medication levamisole, which is sometimes used as a cutting agent of illicitly produced cocaine.

History
It was discovered in 1962 by Edward John Hurlburt, and was quickly found in 1963 to have an anorectic effect in rats. It was introduced as a prescription appetite suppressant in Germany, Switzerland and Austria in 1965, but was withdrawn in 1972 after it was found to cause pulmonary hypertension in approximately 0.2% of patients, and was linked to a number of deaths.

Synthesis
The synthesis was first reported in a structure-activity relationship study of 2-amino-5-aryl-2-oxazolines, where aminorex was found to be approximately 2.5 times more potent than D-amphetamine sulfate in inducing anorexia in rats, and was also reported to have CNS stimulant effects.

The racemic synthesis involves addition/cyclization reaction of 2-amino-1-phenylethanol with cyanogen bromide. A similar synthesis has been also published. In a search for a cheaper synthetic route, a German team developed an alternative route which, by using chiral styrene oxide, allows an enantiopure product.

See also 
 4-Methylaminorex
 Clominorex
 Cyclazodone
 Fenozolone
 Fluminorex
 Pemoline
 Thozalinone
 List of aminorex analogues

References

5-HT2B agonists
Anorectics
Stimulants
Serotonin receptor agonists
Norepinephrine-dopamine releasing agents
Withdrawn drugs
Aminorexes